Autometric Inc. was a company spun out of Paramount Pictures to work with early satellite imagery. Early successes at Autometric included the invention of the Chromatron, which was subsequently sold to Sony and used prior to developing the Trinitron. Autometric created image analysis software for representing imagery of the earth, cataloging, and image analysis and developed early orthophotographic hardware and methodology. Raytheon subsequently acquired the company and transitioned its product focus to military and intelligence projects as the Autometric Operation of Raytheon. In a few years, Autometric split off from Raytheon becoming independent. 

Autometric's nominally successful products included Wings Mission Rehearsal, Edge Whole Earth, Spatial Query Server and DataMaster. Wings and Edge were direct predecessors to Google Earth.  Bob Cowling, the Director of Product Engineering at Autometric, was the primary developer of Wings. Wings was a mission rehearsal product draping imagery over terrain.  With advances learned from that experience, Bob built a globe which led to the formation of Edge Whole Earth.  Edge was used to develop graphics for National Geographic, CBS Evening News, and the motion picture "Shadow Conspiracy." The success of Edge led to several smaller spin offs, including Edge Development Option.  Many of the engineers working on Edge Development Option, went to work for Keyhole, Inc. helping to create what is now Google Earth.

After a series of management blunders and near bankruptcies, Boeing Inc. purchased the company at the end of 2000 as part of the Future Imagery Architecture. Unfortunately, the Future Imagery Architecture became the most spectacular and expensive failure in the 50-year history of American spy satellite projects. Since the F.I.A. debacle, the National Reconnaissance Office has banned Boeing from bidding on new spy satellite contracts. Within ten years, Boeing management shelved all of Automatic's products and removed all references to the company and its products from Boeing websites.

References

Remote sensing companies
Photography companies of the United States